Mukhwas is a colorful South Asian after-meal snack or digestive aid widely used as a mouth freshener, especially after meals. It can be made of various seeds and nuts, often fennel, anise, coconut, coriander, and sesame. They are sweet in flavor and highly aromatic due to added sugar and the addition of various essential oils, including peppermint oil. The seeds can be savory or sweet—coated in sugar and brightly colored.

The word is an amalgamation of  the Sanskrit words mukh (mouth) and vaas (smell).

See also 
Muisjes

References

Indian snack foods
Pakistani snack foods
Nepalese cuisine
Indo-Caribbean cuisine